Bilfinger Deutsche Babcock Middle East (FZE) is an internationally active construction and engineering services company located in the United Arab Emirates; it is part of Division Piping Systems and part of the framework Bilfinger SE.

Overview
Bilfinger Deutsche Babcock Middle East is an engineering company in the Persian Gulf that is headquartered in Dubai, United Arab Emirates, where it is among the leading companies in its sector. Bilfinger Deutsche Babcock Middle East was established in 1968 by Babcock Borsig Service and has completed in the Persian Gulf area a broad portfolio of projects in different sectors such as Erection, Maintenance, Refurbishment, O&M and Life Cycle Services in the Power, water as well as the oil & gas industries.

Middle East presence

Business growth in the Persian Gulf was followed by geographical diversification and local and international expansion. The presence of Bilfinger Deutsche Babcock Middle East in the Persian Gulf area spans on main local markets with direct subsidiary companies in three different states of the Arabian peninsula: United Arab Emirates, Kuwait and Saudi Arabia. It also operates representative offices in Oman and Bahrain.

Company Organization

Holding Company
Bilfinger Deutsche Babcock Middle East (FZE), Dubai, UAE – Holding company – Management of all Bilfinger Deutsche Babcock Middle East subsidiaries in the GCC.

Subsidiary Companies
Deutsche Babcock LLC, Abu Dhabi, UAE – Operating company in the UAE. Joint-venture with Bin Hamoodah Trading & General Services. This company controls representative agencies also in Oman and Bahrain.

Babcock Borsig Service Arabia Ltd, Al Khobar, Saudi Arabia - Operating company in Saudi Arabia.

Babcock Borsig Service GmbH - Kuwait branch, Shuwaikh Area - Kuwait City, Kuwait – Operating company in Kuwait.

History
Founded in 1968, Bilfinger Deutsche Babcock Middle East took advantage of the emerging market in the United Arab Emirates and Kuwait during the 1970s and the consequent oil-producing countries' boom. Bilfinger Deutsche Babcock Middle East started as an engineering services company, specialized in industrial engineering and electro-mechanical industrial works.

Since then, Bilfinger Deutsche Babcock Middle East began an involvement all the Persian Gulf area. In 2003, Bilfinger Deutsche Babcock Middle East established Deutsche Babcock Al Jaber, a joint venture with Al Jaber Group Engineering Company in Qatar, which marked a key milestone and plays a key role in the company's expansion. Since 2005, Bilfinger Deutsche Babcock Middle East is part of Bilfinger SE. 
In 2006, Bilfinger Deutsche Babcock Middle East also expanded into Saudi Arabia.

Today, Bilfinger Deutsche Babcock Middle East is among the leading European engineering companies historically present in the Persian Gulf.

Services

Construction, maintenance, rehabilitation, O&M and life cycle services in the oil, gas, chemical, power and water industries.

See also
 Bilfinger SE
 Babcock Borsig Service
 Debaj - Deutsche Babcock Al Jaber

References

External links
 Bilfinger Deutsche Babcock Middle East Official Website
 Bilfinger Deutsche Babcock LLC page
 Babcock Borsig Service GmbH - Kuwait branch page
 Babcock Borsig Service Arabia Ltd page
 Bilfinger SE Official Website

Engineering companies of the United Arab Emirates